Greene Street Friends School is a coeducational school under the care of Green Street Monthly Meeting of the Religious Society of Friends. Located in Germantown, Philadelphia, Greene Street serves 320 students in grades Pre-K to 8.

History

In December 2012, Greene Street purchased the property known as "the doctor's house" on the corner of Greene Street and West School House Lane.  The building was demolished and the school hopes to add more green space to its campus. After demolition, Greene Street Friends built a porous, landscaped parking lot. They recently constructed a new building over their previously existing, non-porous parking lot. The new building includes a gym and music room and some new classrooms.

Notable alumni

Saul Perlmutter, Nobel Prize–winning astrophysicist./
Holly Robinson Peete, actress
Chris Dudley, basketball player and politician
Mat Johnson, author
Dylan Tichenor, film editor
Lydia Artymiw, concert pianist
Eugene Byrd, actor
Rob Hardy, director
Jaleel Shaw, jazz saxophonist
Risë Wilson, activist

References

Quaker schools in Pennsylvania
Educational institutions established in 1855
High schools in Philadelphia
Private middle schools in Pennsylvania
Private elementary schools in Pennsylvania
1855 establishments in Pennsylvania
Germantown, Philadelphia